The La Prevoyante Stakes is a thoroughbred horse race run annually in mid September at Woodbine Racetrack in Toronto, Ontario, Canada. An Ontario Sire Stakes, it is a restricted race for three-year-old fillies. It is contested over a distance of one and one-sixteenth miles (8.5 furlongs) on all-weather track and currently carries a purse of $125,000.

Inaugurated in 1975, it was raced at a distance of seven furlongs until 1979 when it was modified to a distance of one mile. Beginning in 2018, it was run at  miles on the all-weather track. For 1977 only, the race was run on dirt and in 1979 it was run in two divisions.

The race was named to honor the Canadian Horse Racing Hall of Fame and U.S. Racing Hall of Fame inductee, La Prevoyante. Owned by Quebec businessman and prominent racing stable owner, Jean-Louis Levesque's, La Prevoyante went undefeated in all twelve of her races in 1972 and was voted U.S. Champion 2-Year-Old Filly and Canadian Horse of the Year. In 1974, she collapsed and died of a ruptured lung following the Miss Florida Handicap at Calder Race Course, which also honored her with its own La Prevoyante Stakes. The La Prevoyante at Calder has since been moved to Gulfstream Park.

Records
Speed record: 
 1:34.68 - Blonde Executive (2004) (at 1 mile)

Most wins by an owner:
 3 - Gus Schickedanz (1979, 1997, 1998)
 3 - Sam-Son Farm (1985, 1987, 1991)

Most wins by a jockey:
 4 - Richard Dos Ramos (1996, 1997, 2000, 2004)
4 - Eurico Rosa da Silva (2008, 2009, 2017, 2018)

Most wins by a trainer:
 3 - Macdonald Benson (1984, 1989, 1993)
 3 - James E. Day (1985, 1987, 1991)

Winners

References
 The La Prevoyante Stakes at Pedigree Query
 The 2007 La Prevoyante Stakes at Woodbine Racetrack

Ungraded stakes races in Canada
Turf races in Canada
Flat horse races for three-year-old fillies
Recurring sporting events established in 1975
Woodbine Racetrack
1975 establishments in Ontario